Where Is Vidya Balan is a 2015 Telugu crime comedy entertainer film.

Plot

Kiran (Prince) is a simple pizza delivery boy who falls in love with a doctor named Swathi (Jyotii Sethi). He starts wooing her and some how succeeds in winning her love. While all this is going on, the couple suddenly get stuck in a chaotic situation where a deadly minister (Jaya Prakash Reddy), a reputed doctor (Rao Ramesh) and a funny don (Sampoornesh Babu) are after Vidya Balan. Who is this Vidya Balan? Why is everyone after her? and what is this chaotic situation all about?

Cast

References

2010s Telugu-language films